Eight Below is a 2006 American survival drama film, a remake based on the 1983 Japanese film Antarctica by Toshirô Ishidô, Koreyoshi Kurahara, Tatsuo Nogami and Susumu Saji. It was produced by Patrick Crowley and David Hoberman, directed by Frank Marshall with music by Mark Isham and written by David DiGilio. It stars Paul Walker in the leading role, Bruce Greenwood, Moon Bloodgood, and Jason Biggs. It was released theatrically on February 17, 2006, by Walt Disney Pictures in the United States. The film is set in Antarctica, but was filmed in Svalbard, Norway, Greenland, and British Columbia, Canada. It tells the story of a guide at an Antarctica research base who risks his life and the lives of his colleagues to save his dogs. The film received positive reviews from critics and it earned $120.4 million on a $40 million budget.

Plot

In January 1993, Jerry Shepard, guide at an Antarctica research base of the National Science Foundation, is asked to take UCLA professor, Dr. Davis McClaren to Mount Melbourne to find a rare meteorite from Mercury. As the ice conditions are poor, the best way to the mountain is by dog sled.

Shepard and McClaren make it, but are called back to base camp due to an approaching storm. McClaren begs for more time, and Shepard gives him half a day, enough time to find a fragment of the meteorite. En route back to base, McClaren slips down an embankment, breaking his leg and falling into freezing water. Shepard uses lead dog Maya to carry a rope to McClaren and pulls him out. They battle hypothermia, frostbite and near whiteout conditions as the dogs lead them to base. Once there, the entire human crew is immediately evacuated, while the dogs are left behind. Promised that their pilot will return shortly for the dogs, Shepard tightens their collars to ensure they cannot get loose. But because of the harsh weather conditions, an immediate rescue cannot be attempted.

Back in the United States, Shepard tries to secure a plane to return and save the dogs, but no one is willing to finance the risky expedition. Five months later, Shepard makes one last attempt to get back. McClaren finally realizes the magnitude of his ingratitude and uses the remaining balance of his grant money to finance a rescue mission. They fear that there is little chance that any of the dogs could have survived this long, but they decide to try.

The eight sled dogs – lead dog Maya, Old Jack, Shorty, Dewey, Truman, Shadow, Buck, and the young Max, wait in the freezing conditions for Shepard to return. After two weeks without eating, a gull flies near, prompting the dogs into action, and they all begin to break free, one by one. Old Jack, too weak by now, remains attached, and Maya stays to try to free him while the others chase the flock of gulls that have landed nearby. Maya sees Old Jack has given up, and she reluctantly leaves him behind when he shows no sign of wanting to leave the base. Maya joins up with the other dogs, and they all work together to attack the gulls and manage to kill a few, getting their first food in weeks.

After nearly two months on their own, having kept their strength up and still traveling, the dogs rest on a slope one night under the southern lights. Fascinated by the display, they run about and play until Dewey slips and falls down an incline, mortally wounded at the bottom. The team stays by his side, sleeping with him. Dewey dies the following morning and Max loyally stays by his side while the others move on; by the time Max heads in their direction, he has lost traces of the pack.

Maya leads the team to the Russian base, which is unsecured and full of food, while Max finds his way back to the American base, which is well locked up. Setting back out, Max recognizes the embankment the dogs traveled through on their way back from Mount Melbourne. Exploring, Max finds a dead orca, but is driven off by a leopard seal nesting inside the body. Maya and the team are nearby, they hear Max and join him. Max lures the seal away so the dogs can eat. However, it doubles back and attacks Maya, who is badly injured when it bites her leg. In a rage, the other five dogs jump on the seal, tearing and slashing at it. The seal, overwhelmed, quickly drags itself into the water and away, and the dogs feast on the orca. After, the reunited team, continue traveling. Starving, freezing and exhausted, eventually the injured Maya collapses into the snow. The dogs lie down beside their leader as the snow piles up. They have been on their own for six months.

Shepard goes to New Zealand looking for a boat to take him to Antarctica.  At a bar he reunites with his friends and they make it back to base together. Upon arrival to base, they are dismayed to find the body of Old Jack, still attached to the chain, and no sign of the other dogs. They then hear barking and see Max, Shorty, Truman, Shadow and Buck come over the horizon. After a joyous reunion, Shepard loads the dogs to leave, but Max runs off, leading Shepard to Maya, lying in the snow – weak, but alive. With six of his eight sled dogs, Shepard and his crew head back to civilization, with the last scene showing a grave for the two fallen dogs, Old Jack and Dewey.

Cast
 Paul Walker as Jerry Shepard
 Bruce Greenwood as Dr. Davis McClaren
 Moon Bloodgood as Katie
 Jason Biggs as Charlie Cooper
 Gerard Plunkett as Dr. Andy Harrison
 August Schellenberg as Mindo
 Wendy Crewson as Eve McClaren
 Belinda Metz as Rosemary Paris
 Connor Christopher Levins as Eric McClaren
 Duncan Fraser as Captain Lovett
 Michael David Simms as Armin Butler
 Malcolm Stewart as Charles Buffett

Background
The 1958 Japanese Antarctic Research Expedition (Showa Station) inspired the 1983 hit film Antarctica, of which Eight Below is a remake. Eight Below adapts the events of the 1958 incident, moved forward to 1993.  In the 1958 event, 15 Sakhalin Husky sled dogs were abandoned when the expedition team was unable to return to the base. When the team returned a year later, two dogs, Taro and Jiro, were still alive. Another seven were still chained up and dead, and six were unaccounted for. In Eight Below, two of the dogs, Old Jack and Dewey died, while the remaining six, Max, Maya, Truman, Buck, Shadow and Shorty, survived.

Eight Below was dedicated to the memory of Koreyoshi Kurahara, the director of Antarctica, who died in 2002.

Sled dogs
In Eight Below there are two Alaskan Malamutes (Buck and Shadow) and six Siberian Huskies (Max, Maya, Truman, Dewey, Shorty, and Old Jack). Each actor-dog had help from other dogs that performed stunts and pulled sleds. In all, over 30 dogs were used to portray the film's eight canine characters. Max, Maya, Dewey, and Buck (Old Jack's stunt double) were played by dogs seen in Disney's live-action Snow Dogs.  The animal filming was supervised by the American Humane Association, and the film carries the standard "No animals were harmed..." disclaimer, despite an on-set incident in which a trainer used significant force to break up an animal fight.

Release

Critical reception
On the review aggregator Rotten Tomatoes the film has a rating of 72%, based on 152 reviews, with an average rating of 6.50/10. The site's critical consensus reads, "Featuring a stellar cast of marooned mutts, who deftly display emotion, tenderness, loyalty and resolve, Eight Below is a heartwarming and exhilarating adventure film." On Metacritic it has a score of 64% based on reviews from 31 critics, indicating "generally favorable reviews". Audiences surveyed by CinemaScore gave the film a grade "A" on scale of A to F.

Roger Ebert of the Chicago Sun-Times gave the film 3 out of 4 stars, and said "Eight Below succeeds as an effective story." BBC liked the movie as well, but did not like its long length (2 hours). Reel.com liked it, saying "the movie succeeds at drawing you into their incredible adventure". Peter Hartlaub of the San Francisco Chronicle disliked the film, saying: "The movie is overly long and much too intense for small children, yet it's filled with dialogue and plot turns that are too juvenile to thrill adult audiences." William Arnold of the Seattle Post-Intelligencer reacted favorably ("the dog actors will melt your heart"), but pointed out, as did other reviewers, that "Antarctica buffs" will be critical of errors, such as portraying midwinter events occurring in "balmy, blazing daylight at a time Antarctica is locked in round-the-clock darkness and temperatures of 140 degrees below."

Box office
The film opened at #1 on February 17, 2006, with a total weekend gross of $20,188,176 in 3,066 theaters, averaging to about $6,584 per theater. The film closed on June 1, 2006 with a total worldwide gross of $120,453,565 ($81,612,565 domestic and $38,841,000 in other territories).

Awards
Wins
 ASCAP Film and Television Music Awards: ASCAP Award, Top Box Office Films (Mark Isham) 2007.
Nominations
 Satellite Awards: Satellite Award, Best Youth DVD, 2006.

Home media

The film was released on DVD on June 20, 2006. It was also released on PlayStation Portable (an original widescreen format) on June 27, 2006. The film was released on high definition Blu-ray for an original widescreen presentation on September 19, 2006.

In North America, the DVD release has sold more than  units and grossed .

References

External links
 
 
 

2006 films
2006 drama films
American drama films
American remakes of Japanese films
American survival films
Drama films based on actual events
Films scored by Mark Isham
Films about dogs
Films about friendship
Films directed by Frank Marshall
Films set in 1993
Films set in Antarctica
Films set in British Columbia
Films set in Greenland
Films set in Norway
Films shot in British Columbia
Films shot in Greenland
Films shot in New Zealand
Films shot in Norway
Mandeville Films films
Mushing films
Spyglass Entertainment films
The Kennedy/Marshall Company films
Walt Disney Pictures films
Films set in New Zealand
Vertigo Entertainment films
Films produced by David Hoberman
2000s English-language films
2000s American films